Tom Kitt (born 11 July 1952) is an Irish former Fianna Fáil politician. He served as a Teachta Dála (TD) for the Dublin South constituency from 1987 to 2011, and a Minister of State from 1992 to 1994 and from 1997 to 2008.

Early and private life
Tom Kitt was born in Galway and educated at St Jarlath's College, Tuam and St Patrick's College of Education, Dublin. Kitt worked as a primary school teacher before becoming involved in local politics.

Kitt has run several marathons. He completed the Dublin Marathon on five occasions as well as the Berlin Marathon (1991), the Belfast Marathon (1996), the Buckfast marathon (2010) and the 100th Boston Marathon in 1996.

He is a son of Michael F. Kitt, who was a TD for various Galway constituencies (1948–1951 and 1957–1975), and a brother of Michael P. Kitt, a former TD for Galway East (1975–77, 1981–2002 and 2007–16). His sister, Áine Brady is a former TD for Kildare North (2007 to 2011), and his brother-in-law Gerry Brady is a former TD for Kildare (1982). Tom Kitt's sons David, Thomas and Robbie are musicians.

Political career
In 1979, he was elected to Dublin County Council for the local electoral area of Whitechurch, and in 1985 for Dundrum. He was elected to Dáil Éireann at the 1987 general election as a Fianna Fáil TD. He was re-elected at all subsequent general elections until his retirement in 2011.

In February 1992, when Albert Reynolds succeeded as Taoiseach, Kitt was appointed as Minister of State at the Department of the Taoiseach with special responsibility for arts and culture, women's affairs and European affairs. In January 1993, he was appointed as Minister of State at the Department of the Taoiseach with special responsibility for European Affairs and at the Department of Foreign Affairs with special responsibility for European Affairs and Overseas Development Assistance. He served until Fianna Fáil lost office in December 1994.

Under Bertie Ahern he became Fianna Fáil spokesman on Labour Affairs in 1995. After the 1997 general election, Fianna Fáil returned to office and Kitt was appointed by the government as Minister of State at the Department of Enterprise, Trade and Employment with special responsibility for labour affairs, consumer rights and international trade. After the 2002 general election, he was appointed as Minister of State at the Department of Foreign Affairs with responsibility for Overseas Development and Human Rights. In a September 2004 reshuffle, Kitt was appointed as Government Chief Whip and Minister of State at the Department of the Taoiseach and Minister of State at the Department of Defence. He was reappointed after the 2007 general election.

In May 2008, when Brian Cowen became Taoiseach, he was not re-appointed as government chief whip. He declined the offer of another junior ministry, and announced his intention to retire from the Dáil at the following general election, which would take place in February 2011.

See also
Families in the Oireachtas

References

 

 

1952 births
Living people
Alumni of St Patrick's College, Dublin
Councillors of Dublin County Council
Fianna Fáil TDs
Government Chief Whip (Ireland)
Irish schoolteachers
Tom
Local councillors in Dún Laoghaire–Rathdown
Members of the 25th Dáil
Members of the 26th Dáil
Members of the 27th Dáil
Members of the 28th Dáil
Members of the 29th Dáil
Members of the 30th Dáil
Ministers of State of the 26th Dáil
Ministers of State of the 27th Dáil
Ministers of State of the 28th Dáil
Ministers of State of the 29th Dáil
Ministers of State of the 30th Dáil
People educated at St Jarlath's College
Politicians from County Galway